Henry and Elizabeth Berkheimer Farm is a historic home and farm complex located at Washington Township, York County, Pennsylvania.  It includes the farmhouse (1817), Sweitzer barn (1847), summer kitchen (c. 1840), and wagon shed (c. 1870).  Also on the property are a woodshed, hog barn, poultry house, and seed house, all built about 1920; a metal windmill dated to 1909; and the site of an early 19th-century woolen mill and millrace.  The farmhouse is a banked 2 1/2-story Pennsylvania German vernacular dwelling built of rough cut brownstone. It measures 48 feet wide by 23 feet deep.

It was added to the National Register of Historic Places in 2000.

References

Farms on the National Register of Historic Places in Pennsylvania
Houses completed in 1817
Buildings and structures in York County, Pennsylvania
Houses in York County, Pennsylvania
National Register of Historic Places in York County, Pennsylvania